Operazione San Pietro (Operation St. Peter's) is a soundtrack album for the 1967 Lucio Fulci movie of the same name - with music by Ward Swingle performed by The Swingle Singers.

Track listing
"Titoli: Operazione San Pietro" – 1:54		
"Operazione Recupero" – 1:48		
"Francescani All'attacc" – 1:43		
"Sua Eminenza" – 1:01		
"Tre Imbroglioni Per Un Cardinale" – 1:46		
"Il Clero Alla Riscossa" – 1:09		
"Meglio La Liberta'" – 0:57		
"L' Americana" – 1:54		
"Flash" – 1:46		
"Verso La Capitale" – 1:41		
"Grand Hotel" – 1:49		
"Fuga In Bulldozer" – 1:50		
"One Dollar" – 1:40		
"Furtivo" – 1:32	
"L' Indecisione Del Cajella" – 1:10

Personnel

Vocals
Jeanette Baucomont – soprano
Christiane Legrand – soprano
Hélène Devos – alto
Claudine Meunier – alto
Ward Swingle – tenor, arranger
Joseph Noves – tenor
Jean Cussac – bass
José Germain – bass

Rhythm section
Guy Pedersen – double bass
Daniel Humair or Bernard Lubat – drums

References / external links

CAM 515333-2 (CAM Original Soundtracks)
Operazione San Pietro at [ Allmusic.com]

The Swingle Singers albums
1968 soundtrack albums
Comedy film soundtracks
Italian-language soundtracks